Revenger may refer to:

Books and comics
Revenger (novel) 2016 science fiction novel by British author Alastair Reynolds.
 The Revengers (novel), a 1982 spy novel.
 Revengers, a fictional group of supervillains in Marvel's comic universe.

Film and TV
 Revenger (film), 2018 South Korean action film.
 Revenger (TV series), a 2023 anime series.
 The Revengers (film), a 1972 Western film.